Crystal City 47 Public Schools is a school district headquartered in Crystal City, Missouri in Greater St. Louis. It operates Crystal City Elementary School and Crystal City High School.

Notable alumni
Bill Bradley, three-term United States Senator representing New Jersey from 1979 to 1997. Graduated from Crystal City High School (1961).

References

External links
 Crystal City 47 Public Schools

Education in Jefferson County, Missouri
School districts in Missouri